Yousef Al Shamali is the Jordanian Minister of Industry, Trade and Supply. He was appointed as minister on 11 October 2021. Previously he had served as Minister of Labor since 29 March 2021 in Bisher Al-Khasawneh's Cabinet led by Prime Minister Bisher Al-Khasawneh.

Education 
Shamali holds a Bachelor in Financial Science and Banking from the Yarmouk University.

References 

Living people
21st-century Jordanian politicians
Government ministers of Jordan
Trade ministers of Jordan
Industry ministers of Jordan
Supply ministers of Jordan
Year of birth missing (living people)

Yarmouk University alumni